Skeleton Jar is the second album by  Australian rock band Youth Group. It was first released in Australia on 22 March 2004, and on 24 May 2005 on Epitaph Records in the United States with a re-arranged track listing and one new song. The US version was released in Australia as a "repackaged" album in July 2004. In 2011 the album was voted #98 on Australian radio station Triple J's Hottest 100 Australian Albums of All Time (Industry List).

The album marked a transition point for the band, whose lineup had been stable for the first six years. Over the course of the recording sessions, bassist Andy Cassell and guitarist Paul Murphy quit, to be replaced by Patrick Matthews and Cameron Ellison–Elliott respectively, while Johnno Lattin also played bass on some tracks after Cassell's departure. "All of a sudden everything's gone kind of haywire," songwriter and singer-guitarist Toby Martin said.

Martin said the album added a strong folk flavour to the band's rock roots. He told the Herald Sun: "I've definitely been listening to more older stuff in the time leading up to recording this record—like Dylan and the Velvet Underground. I really like country and folk music, so I think it's always going to come through. Maybe this time it's come through in a more authentic way, rather than playing with a genre, just playing it because we like it. I think the guitar-picking stuff on this record mostly comes from Bob Dylan or Nick Drake and that sort of stuff, more folk kind of things."

Music videos were produced for the singles "Skeleton Jar," "Shadowland" and "Baby Body."

Track listing
All songs by Youth Group.

Notes
 The song deleted from the 2005 release, "Rosie and the Sea," appeared on the band's "Shadowland" single.
 The song "Someone Else's Dream" on the 2005 release was later issued on the band's "Forever Young" single in February 2006.

Personnel 
 Toby Martin – vocals, guitar
 Cameron Ellison-Elliott – guitar
 Patrick Matthews – bass
 Danny Lee Allen – drums
 Andy Cassell – bass
 Johnno Lattin – bass
 Paul Murphy – lead guitar

Additional personnel
 Wayne Connolly – pedal steel

References

2004 albums
Youth Group albums
Ivy League Records albums
Epitaph Records albums